Tatiana Urayevna Panova (born 13 August 1976, Moscow, Russian SFSR, Soviet Union) is a former Russian tennis player. On 23 September 2002, she reached her career-high singles ranking, when she peaked at world No. 20.

Career 
2002 was the first year that Panova really jumped into the spotlight, reaching finals in Auckland and Sarasota early in the season. That year she also reached quarterfinals of Miami Open by beating Arantxa Sánchez Vicario in straight sets. She reached the third round of Roland Garros, Wimbledon, and at the US Open, defeating Mirjana Lučić and Anna Kournikova along the way. Martina Navratilova, at age 45, beat her at Eastbourne, in her first singles match in eight years.

Panova was a member of the Russian Federation Cup team, going 12–3 throughout her career.

WTA career finals

Singles: 3 (3 runner-ups)

Doubles: 1 (1 runner-up)

ITF Circuit finals

Singles: 8 (6–2)

Doubles: 1 (0–1)

Head-to-head record
 Arantxa Sánchez Vicario 1–0
 Lindsay Davenport 0–5
 Martina Hingis 0–5
 Kim Clijsters 0–2
 Justine Henin 0–1
 Venus Williams 0–2
 Martina Navratilova 0–1
 Jelena Janković 2–0
 Amélie Mauresmo 0–7
 Monica Seles 0–2
 Nadia Petrova 1–1
 Julia Vakulenko 0–1

References

External links
 
 
 

Tennis players from Moscow
Russian female tennis players
1976 births
Living people